The Canadian Centre for Refugee and Immigrant Health Care is a healthcare clinic in Scarborough, Toronto, that provides free healthcare to refugee and immigrants.

The centre, which opened in 1999, is led by Paul Caulford M.D. As of 2021 it had 70 healthcare professionals providing care.

Organization 
The clinic is located at the intersection of Sheppard Avenue and Midland Avenue.

It is run by volunteers and led by Paul Caulford M.D.

Activities 
The clinic provides medical and dental services to people who had needs, but are not covered by the Ontario Health Insurance Plan, specifically refugees and migrants. The clinic regularly sees seriously ill patients who have been refused care due to their immigration status.

History 
The clinic opened in a church basement 1999. In 1999 it had three volunteer doctors, by 2021 that had grown to a team of 70 medical, dental and social workers.

In 2016, the centre saw a significant increase demand for services from woman and children refugees who had initially fled violence in various countries in Africa for USA, but due to new immigration policies enacted by Donald Trump, had fled the US for Canada. Patients, ill-prepared for the journey to Canada arrived with frostbite.

In 2018, the centre struggled to keep up with the demand for its services and made a public call for more nurses and doctors to volunteer.

In 2020, while providing COVID-19 vaccines, the center was running out of personal protective equipment.

Notable staff and volunteers 

 Paul Caulford, director
 Sumathy Rahunathan, clinic coordinator and research lead

See also 

 Convention Relating to the Status of Refugees

References

External links 

 Official website

Refugee aid organizations in Canada
Medical and health organizations based in Canada
Immigrant services organizations
Organizations based in Toronto